San Esteban de Litera or Sant Esteve de Llitera is a municipality located in the province of Huesca, Aragon, Spain. According to the 2004 census (INE), the municipality has a population of 562 inhabitants.

During the War of the Spanish Succession on 15 January 1706, it was the site of a minor but bloody battle between a French force of 4,500 and a combined English-Dutch detachment of 1,500, which ended with the French withdrawing.

References

Sources
 

Municipalities in the Province of Huesca